Susan Elizabeth Phillips (born December 11, 1944 in Cincinnati, Ohio) is a romance novelist from the United States. She is the creator of the sports romance and has been called the “Queen of Romantic Comedy.”

Biography

Phillips was born on December 11 in Cincinnati, Ohio to John Aller Titus and Louesa Coate Titus.  After receiving a B.F.A. in theater arts from Ohio University, Phillips taught drama, speech, and English at a local high school until her first child was born, then became a stay-at-home mother.

In 1976, the family moved from Ohio to New Jersey. There Phillips and her neighbor, Claire Lefkowitz, often discussed the books they liked to read. Together they wrote a historical romance, The Copeland Bride, which was published in 1983 under the pen name Justine Cole. After Claire and her family moved, Phillips began writing by herself. Her subsequent novels, were published under her own name.

Phillips and her husband, Bill, met on a blind date while in college.  They have two grown sons, and live in Chicago, Illinois.

Honors
Phillips is the only five-time winner of the Romance Writers of America Favorite Book of the Year Award. In 2001, she was inducted into the Romance Writers Hall of Fame and in 2006 was a recipient of the Romance Writers of America's Lifetime Achievement Award.

 Natural Born Charmer - Quill nominee for best romance of 2007
 It Had to Be You: 1995 Rita Awards Best Novel winner
 Nobody's Baby But Mine: 1998 Rita Awards Best Novel winner
 Dream a Little Dream: 1999  Rita Awards Best Novel winner
 First Lady: 2001 Rita Awards Best Novel winner
 Call Me Irresistible: Named by Library Journal as one of the best romance books of 2011, Top 10 Romance Fiction 2011 Booklist Online, RT Reviewers Choice Best Book Awards 2011 Contemporary Romance Nominee

Bibliography

Stand-alone novels 
 The Copeland Bride (1983) (with Claire Kiehl, as Justine Cole)
 Risen, Glory (1984)
 Hot Shot (1991)
 Honey Moon (1993)
 Kiss an Angel (1996)
 Just Imagine (2001) (revised and retitled version of Risen, Glory)
 Breathing Room (2002)
 Ain't She Sweet? (2005)
 Heroes Are My Weakness (2014)
 Dance Away with Me (2020)

Chicago Stars series 
 It Had To Be You (1994)
 Heaven, Texas (1995)
 Nobody's Baby But Mine (1997)
 Dream a Little Dream (1998)
 This Heart of Mine (2001)
 Match Me if You Can (2005)
 Natural Born Charmer (2007)
 First Star I See Tonight (2016)
 When Stars Collide (2021)

Wynette, Texas books 
 Glitter Baby (original 1987; revised rewrite 2009)
 Fancy Pants (1989)
 Lady Be Good (1999)
 First Lady (2000)
 What I Did For Love (2009)
 Call Me Irresistible (2010)
 The Great Escape (2012)

Omnibus 
 Honey Moon / Hot Shot (2005)
 Nobody's Baby But Mine / This Heart of Mine (2006)

Footnotes

External links
Susan Elizabeth Phillips Official Website
Barnes and Noble Profile of Susan E. Phillips
Susan Elizabeth Phillips in FantasticFiction

20th-century American novelists
21st-century American novelists
American romantic fiction writers
American women novelists
Living people
RITA Award winners
Novelists from Ohio
1948 births
Women romantic fiction writers
20th-century American women writers
21st-century American women writers